The Essential Gloria Estefan is the seventh compilation album released by American singer Gloria Estefan, but is the twenty-eighth album overall, released in 2006. It is part of Sony BMG's The Essential series.

The album included a special bonus interview by Internet, in which Estefan talks about every song of the album.

On August 31, 2010, the album was reissued with a bonus disc and retitled "Essential 3.0". The third (bonus) disc contains eight songs including a rare edited version of "Betcha Say That".

Track listing

Chart positions
In Switzerland, the compilation entered at number ninety-nine, charting for a week. Later, the compilation charted within the Top 100 on the Dutch, Belgian and Italian charts.

References

Gloria Estefan compilation albums
2006 greatest hits albums
Albums produced by Emilio Estefan